Harti Badievich Kanukov (Russian cyrillic: Харти Бадиевич Кануков, Zundov, Don Host Oblast, December 5 jul./December 17 gre., 1883-Elista, February 7, 1933) was Soviet politician, soldier, journalist, translator and writer Kalmyk origin.

Life 
He was a member of the Communist Party and the Red Army, where he was a cavalry brigade commissioner.

Despite being born in a semi-nomad family, he could go to school and became a rural teacher in Denisovski (1902-1908)

In 1908, the police arrested him for organising a trade union revolt, but he was immediately set free under surveillance. In 1909, he served in the Cossack regiment where he later returned, but in 1915 he quit it due to an illness.

From 1920 to 1921, he was assistant and chief of Intelligence.

References and external links

 

1883 births
1933 deaths
Soviet politicians
Soviet writers
Kalmyk-language writers
Soviet translators
Soviet journalists
Kalmyk people
20th-century translators